Robert Mayes (born 18 December 1967) is an English former professional footballer who played as a midfielder.

He made his professional debut for Ipswich Town on 23 November 1988, in a 3–2 win over Oxford United in a Full Members' Cup tie, replacing Frank Yallop as a substitute.

References

External links
Career profile at Non League Daily

1967 births
Living people
Footballers from Suffolk
Sportspeople from Ipswich
English footballers
Association football midfielders
Ipswich Town F.C. players
Bury Town F.C. players
Kettering Town F.C. players
Wivenhoe Town F.C. players
Redbridge Forest F.C. players
Dagenham & Redbridge F.C. players
Sudbury Town F.C. players
Chelmsford City F.C. players
Braintree Town F.C. players
Felixstowe & Walton United F.C. players
Diss Town F.C. players
Maldon & Tiptree F.C. players
F.C. Clacton players
Stowmarket Town F.C. players
National League (English football) players